Albachir Mouctar (born 1 May 1996) is a Nigerien Olympic swimmer. He represented his country at the 2016 Summer Olympics in the Men's 50 metre freestyle event where he ranked at 70th with a time of 26.56 seconds, a national record. He did not advance to the semifinals.

Albachir also holds the Nigerien national record in men's 50 metre breaststroke.

In 2019, he represented Niger at the 2019 African Games held in Rabat, Morocco.

References

External links
 
 

1996 births
Living people
Nigerien male swimmers
Swimmers at the 2016 Summer Olympics
Olympic swimmers of Niger
Swimmers at the 2019 African Games
Nigerien male freestyle swimmers
Male breaststroke swimmers
African Games competitors for Nigeria
21st-century Nigerien people